A state variable filter is a type of active filter in electronic circuits. It consists of one or more integrators, connected in some feedback configuration. It is essentially used when precise Q factor is required, as other multi-order filters are unable to provide. The most common implementation sums the input signal with its integral and its double integral, another is an MDAC based implementation.

Kerwin–Huelsman–Newcomb (KHN) biquad filter example 

The example given below can produce simultaneous lowpass, highpass, and bandpass outputs from a single input. This is a second-order (biquad) filter. Its derivation comes from rearranging a high-pass filter's transfer function, which is the ratio of two quadratic functions. The rearrangement reveals that one signal is the sum of integrated copies of another. That is, the rearrangement reveals a state-variable-filter structure. By using different states as outputs, different kinds of filters can be produced. In more general state-variable-filter examples, additional filter orders are possible with more integrators (i.e., more states).

The signal input is marked Vin; the LP, HP and BP outputs give the lowpass, highpass, and bandpass filtered signals respectively.

For simplicity, we set:

Then:

The pass-band gain for the LP and HP outputs is given by:

It can be seen that the frequency of operation and the Q factor can be varied independently. This and the ability to switch between different filter responses make the state-variable filter widely used in analogue synthesizers.

Values for a resonance frequency of 1 kHz are Rf1 = Rf2 = 10k, C1 = C2 = 15nF and R1 = R2 = 10k.

Applications
State variable filters are frequently used for modifying frequency response in audio signal processing. At low Q settings they are often used in parametric equaliser circuits, and at high or variable Q settings to create resonant filter modules in analog synthesizers. For manual control of frequency, Rf1 and Rf2 in the section above may be replaced by a dual potentiometer; and for voltage control, the devices U2 and U3 may be replaced by voltage controlled amplifiers or operational transconductance amplifiers.

See also
 Linear filter
 Biquad filter

References

 Texas Instruments' UAF42 Universal Active Filter datasheet
 Analog Devices Interactive Design Tools

Linear filters